John Devereaux Wrather Jr. (May 24, 1918 – November 12, 1984), was an entrepreneur and petroleum businessman who became a television producer and later diversified by investing in broadcast stations and resort properties. He is best known for producing The Lone Ranger, Sergeant Preston of the Yukon, and Lassie television series in the 1950s as well as marrying actress Bonita Granville.

Biography
He graduated cum laude with a Bachelor of Arts degree from The University of Texas at Austin in 1939. He worked in the oilfields of East Texas as a wildcatter and pipeline walker as his college summer job. When his father became ill in the early 1940s, he took over as president of his father's oil company, Overton Refining Company.

First marriage and military service
On , he married Molly O'Daniel, the daughter of Democratic Governor and later U.S. Senator Wilbert Lee "Pappy" O'Daniel. They had two children before divorcing in 1945. Wrather served in the U.S. Marine Corps Reserve during World War II (1942–1947) in three campaigns and commanded a Marine air group in the Philippines.

Film business 
After the war, Wrather bought a home in Hollywood and became a movie producer, founding Jack Wrather Pictures Inc. In 1946, he produced his first movie, The Guilty, starring Bonita Granville, whom he later married. By 1955, he had produced six more movies, including High Tide, Perilous Waters, Strike It Rich and Guilty of Treason.  The films were produced for Eagle-Lion Films, Warner Bros., Monogram/Allied Artists and United Artists.

In 1947, he married movie actress Bonita Granville. They had two children. Granville appeared in over 40 movies during the 1930s and 1940s and on many dramatic television series during the 1950s, and later became a producer for the Lassie show. She is best known for playing Nancy Drew in a series of movies in the late 1930s and being the narrator for Lassie.

Wrather purchased 70% of television station KOTV in Tulsa, Oklahoma from fellow oil millionaire George Cameron. The other 30% was owned by station manager Maria Helen Alvarez and commercial manager John Hill. Wrather knew nothing about the management of a station and offered to increase Alvarez and Hill to 50% of the stock in exchange for their services.

Hill wanted to move on to real estate, so Wrather agreed to purchase his shares and increase Alvarez to 50% owner in the new Wrather-Alvarez Television and Wrather-Alvarez Broadcasting companies.

Wrather-Alvarez went on to purchase the San Diego television and radio stations KFMB-TV and KFMB in 1953 and New York City radio station WNEW in 1955. Television station KOTV was sold in 1954 when Alvarez relocated to the San Diego station. Wrather-Alvarez also owned WJDW-TV in Boston, and donated it in 1965 to the WGBH Educational Foundation, which operates it as the PBS station WGBX-TV.

Wrather-Alvarez also financed and owned the Disneyland Hotel in Anaheim. Walt Disney asked Wrather to build the hotel when Disney exhausted his credit line building the Disneyland theme park. The hotel was completed in 1955, and immediately shared the success of Disneyland. When Disney later attempted to buy the hotel, Wrather refused to sell.

In 1954, Wrather-Alvarez purchased the complete rights to the Lone Ranger character and took over production of the television series (1954–1957). The corporation also purchased the Lassie television series in 1956 and the Sergeant Preston of the Yukon television series in 1957.

The Wrather-Alvarez relationship did not end well. Wrather discovered that "Miss" Alvarez had married former partner John Hill when he had been "bought out" and his shares given to Alvarez. Wrather unsuccessfully sued Alvarez and Hill for fraud. In 1958, Wrather bought Alvarez's shares of Wrather-Alvarez and became sole owner of its television and hotel assets. The Wrather-Alvarez holdings were distributed into the separate companies Wrather Hotels, Lone Ranger Inc., Lone Ranger Television, Lone Ranger Pictures, and Lassie Television.

The Independent Television Corporation was formed as a joint venture between Jack Wrather and the British Incorporated Television Company in 1958. In September 1958, Independent Television Corporation purchased TPA for $11,350,000. The company operated primarily as a distribution service for syndicating television shows produced by Wrather or the British ITC company. Wrather later (about 1959–60) sold his shares of Independent Television Corporation to ITC.  He was also the founder of Los Angeles public television station KCET.

Wrather is known as the man that "sued the mask off the Lone Ranger". When a new theatrical movie version of the Lone Ranger was being produced during the late 1970s, Wrather obtained a court order requiring Clayton Moore to quit making public appearances as the Lone Ranger. This resulted in a great deal of negative publicity, and The Legend of the Lone Ranger, released in 1981, was not well received. Before Wrather died, he gave Moore permission to resume making public appearances in costume.

Other investments 
Wrather further diversified his holdings by building or buying resort hotels and other properties throughout the United States.

In addition to the Disneyland Hotel, he owned the Twin Lakes Lodge in Las Vegas, the L'Horizon Hotel in Palm Springs, California, the Balboa Bay Club & Resort in Newport Beach, and the Inn at the Park in Anaheim. In the 1970s, there was talk of the Disneyland-Alweg monorail being expanded to stop at the Inn at the Park, but it never came to fruition. The Inn at the Park has changed ownership frequently, and is currently operated as the Sheraton Park Hotel at the Anaheim Resort.

In 1957, Wrather purchased the Muzak corporation, a company providing "elevator music" for business environments. The company owned an extensive library of easy listening music and one of the world's largest recording plants. Wrather sold the company in 1972.

Over the years, he created or purchased many companies for his businesses and investments, including Evansville Refining Co., Overton Refining Co., Jack Wrather Pictures, Inc., Freedom Productions Corporation, Western States Investment Corporation, Wrather-Alvarez Broadcasting, Inc., General Television Corporation, Jack Wrather Productions, Wrather Hotels, Lone Ranger Inc., Lone Ranger Television, Lone Ranger Pictures, Lassie Television, the Muzak Corporation, and the A.C. Gilbert Company. In 1961, he combined his various holdings into the Wrather Corporation.

Wrather died of cancer on November 12, 1984, at St. John's Hospital in Santa Monica, California. His funeral was held at the Roman Catholic Church of the Good Shepherd in Beverly Hills and he was buried at the Holy Cross Cemetery, in Culver City, California.

Disney finally acquired the Disneyland Hotel in 1987, when it purchased half share ownership in the Wrather Corporation and the other half in 1988. Disney has retained the hotel but sold off most of the other assets. Most of the Wrather franchises are now owned by DreamWorks Classics. Various documents related to Wrather, Bonita Granville, and the Wrather company are archived at Loyola Marymount University as part of its Center for the Study of Los Angeles collection.

Filmography

Films
 The Guilty (1947)
 High Tide (1947)
 Perilous Waters (1948)
 Strike it Rich (1948) 
 Guilty of Treason/Treason (1950)
 The Lone Ranger and the Lost City of Gold (1958)
 The Magic of Lassie (1978)
 The Legend of the Lone Ranger (1981)

TV shows
 The Lone Ranger (1949–57)
 Lassie (1957–74)
 Sergeant Preston of the Yukon (1955–58)

References

External links 
 

1918 births
1984 deaths
People from Amarillo, Texas
People from Tyler, Texas
Television producers from Texas
University of Texas at Austin alumni
Deaths from cancer in California
Burials at Holy Cross Cemetery, Culver City
Businesspeople in the oil industry
American hoteliers
20th-century American businesspeople
Businesspeople from Texas